Deb Gardner (born May 13, 1949) is a County Commissioner of Boulder County in the U.S. state of Colorado.  She was elected in January 2012 as a Democrat to fill the seat vacated by Ben Pearlman.

Prior to her service on the Board of County Commissioners, Gardner served as a Colorado legislator.  She was elected to the Colorado House of Representatives in 2010 to represent House District 11, which includes Northwest Boulder, part of Niwot, Waterstone, part of Gunbarrel, and most of Longmont which is where Gardner lives in Boulder County.  In that election, Gardner defeated Republican Wes Whiteley 59.4 to 40.5 percent.

References 

1949 births
21st-century women
County commissioners in Colorado
Knox College (Illinois) alumni
Living people
Democratic Party members of the Colorado House of Representatives
Women state legislators in Colorado
Place of birth missing (living people)
American accountants
Women accountants
People from Longmont, Colorado
21st-century American women